Events from the year 1977 in France.

Incumbents
 President: Valéry Giscard d'Estaing 
 Prime Minister: Raymond Barre

Events
13 March – Municipal Elections held.
20 March – Municipal Elections held.
27 June – Djibouti receives its independence from France.
10 September – Hamida Djandoubi's is the last guillotine execution in France (at Marseille) and the last legal beheading in the Western world.
7 December – Launch of the Simca Horizon, a five-door medium-sized hatchback which will also be built in Britain as a Chrysler and the US as a Plymouth and Dodge. It replaces the Simca 1100 in France, and runs alongside the Chrysler Avenger saloon and estate in Britain.

Arts and literature
31 January – Centre Georges Pompidou in Paris officially opened.
7 May – Marie Myriam wins the Eurovision Song Contest 1977 for France with her song "L'oiseau et l'enfant" ("The Bird and the Child").

Sport
30 June – Tour de France begins.
24 July – Tour de France ends, won by Bernard Thévenet.

Births

January to March
3 January – Stéphane Pignol, soccer player
4 January
Louisa Baïleche, singer, dancer and performer
Jonathan Cochet, motor racing driver
11 January – Jérôme Kerviel, trader convicted of fraud for the 2008 Société Générale trading loss
26 January – Jean-Michel Sigere, soccer player
27 January – Siramana Dembélé, soccer player
29 January – Alexandre Rousselet, cross-country skier
9 February – Nicolas Coutelot, tennis player
15 February – Pierre-Emmanuel Dalcin, Alpine skier
16 February – Charles P. de Saint-Aignan, software engineer
20 February – Nicolas Dessum, ski jumper
23 February – Freddy Bourgeois, soccer player
27 February – Jean-Pierre Vidal, alpine skier and Olympic gold medallist
28 February
Pierre Mignoni, rugby union player
Jean-François Rivière, soccer player
4 March – Grégory Le Corvec, rugby union player
7 March – Jérôme Fernandez, handball player
8 March – Estelle Desanges, pornographic actress
9 March
Sébastien Chabaud, soccer player
Vincent Defrasne, biathlete and Olympic gold medallist
12 March – David Bouard, soccer player
15 March – Frédéric Serrat, boxer
18 March – Willy Sagnol, international soccer player

April to June
1 April – Vincent Doukantié, soccer player
2 April – Marc Raquil, athlete
13 April – Bertrand Laquait, soccer player
13 April – Olivier Olibeau, rugby union player
30 April – Lilian Compan, soccer player
1 May – Jean-Michel Lesage, soccer player
7 May – Zoé Félix, actress
10 May – Gabriel Monnier, figure skater
20 May – Mathieu Blin, rugby union player
11 June – Vincent Ehouman, soccer player
12 June – Anita Tijoux, alternative hip-hop singer
16 June – Delphine Pelletier, athlete
19 June – Stéphan Perrot, swimmer
22 June – Frédéric Weis, basketball player
24 June – Jean-Philippe Caillet, soccer player
30 June – Christophe Landrin, soccer player

July to September
5 July – Jérôme Éyana, athlete
13 July
Christophe Meslin, soccer player
Romain Mesnil, pole vaulter
20 July – Yves Niaré, shot putter
24 July – Cédric Anselin, soccer player
26 July – Christophe Laurent, cyclist
8 August – Romain Pitau, soccer player
9 August – Mikaël Silvestre, international soccer player
15 August – Malek Aït-Alia, soccer player
17 August – Thierry Henry, international soccer player
18 August – Ludovic Roy, soccer player
23 August – Yoann Bigné, soccer player
24 August – Arnaud Gonzalez, soccer player
27 August – Martial Robin, soccer player
2 September – Frédéric Kanouté, soccer player
3 September – Stéphane Bonsergent, cyclist
3 September – Yannick Zambernardi, soccer player
9 September – Sébastien Gimbert, motorcycle road racer
11 September – Ludovic Hubler, hitchhiker
28 September – Julien Pillet, sabre fencer and twice Olympic medallist
30 September – Jean-Sébastien Jaurès, soccer player

October to December
2 October – Patrick Barul, soccer player
5 October – Christian Bassila, soccer player
7 October – Sébastien de Chaunac, tennis player
8 October – Anne-Caroline Chausson, Mountain bike racer
11 October – Jérémie Janot, soccer player
15 October – David Trezeguet, international soccer player
31 October – Sylviane Félix, athlete and Olympic medallist
31 October – Séverine Ferrer, singer
12 November – Jérémy Henin, soccer player
21 November – Kodjo Afanou, soccer player
23 November – Jean-Baptiste Élissalde, rugby union player
29 November – Cédric Uras, soccer player
30 November – Virginie Guilhaume, television host
1 December – Joseph-Désiré Job, soccer player
2 December – Jérôme Thion, rugby union player
8 December – Sébastien Chabal, rugby union player
14 December – Romain Dumas, motor racing driver
17 December – Arnaud Clément, tennis player
27 December – Emmanuel Macron, French president
30 December – Alex Jeannin, soccer player

Full date unknown
Jean-Pascal Chaigne, composer and musicologist
Éléonore Gosset, actress

Deaths

January to March
10 January – Jean Taris, swimmer and Olympic medallist (born 1909)
12 January – Henri-Georges Clouzot, film director, screenwriter and producer (born 1907)
13 January – Henri Langlois, pioneer of film preservation and restoration (born 1914)
14 January – Anaïs Nin, writer (born 1903)
19 January – Yvonne Printemps, singer and actress (born 1894)
24 January – Marc Detton, rower and Olympic medallist (born 1901)
10 February – Alain Escoffier, anti-communist activist, self-immolated (born 1949)
2 March – Eugénie Brazier, chef, "la mère" of modern French cooking (born 1895)

April to June
3 April – Pierre-Marie Théas, Bishop (born 1894)
11 April
Henri-Irénée Marrou, historian (born 1904).
Jacques Prévert, poet and screenwriter (born 1900)
2 May – Jean-Claude Lebaube, cyclist (born 1937)
May – Annette Laming-Emperaire, archeologist (born 1917)
22 June – Jacqueline Audry, film director (born 1908)

July to September
4 July – Michel Olçomendy, first Archbishop of the Singapore (born 1901)
7 July – Eugène Criqui, world champion boxer (born 1893)
29 July – Pierre Clastres, anthropologist and ethnographer (born 1934)
13 August – Marie-Hélène Cardot, French resistance leader and politician (born 1899)
21 August – Pierre Cot, politician (born 1895)
4 September
Adolphe Jauréguy, rugby union player (born 1898)
Jean Rostand, biologist and philosopher (born 1894)
10 September – Hamida Djandoubi, last person executed in France (born 1949)
14 September – Marcel Carpentier, military officer (born 1895)
29 September – Jean Marsan, screenwriter and actor (born 1920)

October to December
19 October – René Mourlon, athlete and Olympic medallist (born 1893)
20 October – Marie-Thérèse Walter, mistress of Pablo Picasso (born 1909)
25 October – Félix Gouin, politician (born 1884)
3 November – Armand Lunel, writer, last known speaker of Shuadit (born 1892)
5 November – René Goscinny, author, editor and humorist (born 1926)
7 December – Georges Grignard, motor racing driver (born 1905)
12 December – Raymond Bernard, filmmaker (born 1891)
19 December – Jacques Tourneur, film director (born 1904)

Full date unknown
Léonie Duquet, nun, killed by a death squad in Argentina (born 1916)
Marcel Fétique, bow maker (born 1899).
Georges Miquelle, cellist (born 1894)

See also
 1977 in French television
 List of French films of 1977

References

1970s in France